The Heir to Næsbygaard is a 1965 Danish family film directed by Alice O'Fredericks.

Cast
 Asbjørn Andersen as Godsejer Martin Kaas
 Ole Neumann as Martin
 Poul Reichhardt as Pastor Pripp
 Jane Thomsen as Rosa Pripp
 Inger Stender as Fru Pripp
 Karen Berg as Fru Helene
 Agnes Rehni as Tante Thyra
 Ib Mossin as Anker
 Henry Lohmann as Smeden Mortensen
 Sonja Oppenhagen as Elisa
 Helga Frier as Kokkepigen Marie
 Marie-Louise Coninck as Stuepigen Erna
 Bent Vejlby as Torben
 Christian Arhoff as Nick
 Ole Monty as Ole
 Peter Marcell as Forvalter Hermansen
 Valsø Holm as Skærslipper
 Bjørn Puggaard-Müller as Niels Jørgen
 Finn Nielsen as Rocker
 Ann Mariager as Pripp's datter
 Tina Mariager as Pripp's datter

References

External links

1965 films
Danish children's films
1960s Danish-language films
Films directed by Alice O'Fredericks
Films scored by Sven Gyldmark